The Embers Avenue, also known as Embers, was a gay bar and nightclub located in the Old Town Chinatown neighborhood of Portland, Oregon, in the United States. Embers hosted a variety of events, including comedy and drag shows, karaoke, and live music. The club opened in 1969, and closed in late 2017. The Oregonian reported in late November 2017 that the building owner has intentions to fill the space with a similar venue. It was speculated in January 2018 that Badlands was expected to open that year.

Reception 
Donald Olson, writing for Frommer's, rated the venue as two out of three stars. He described the club as a primarily gay disco also appealing to straight people, with "lots of flashing lights and sweaty bodies until the early morning".

References

External links

 
 The Embers Avenue at The Portland Mercury
 Sexy space music by Andrea Vedder (May 4, 2010), Daily Vanguard

1969 establishments in Oregon
2017 disestablishments in Oregon
Defunct LGBT nightclubs in Oregon
Defunct nightclubs in Portland, Oregon
LGBT culture in Portland, Oregon
Northwest Portland, Oregon
Old Town Chinatown